Mount Hope is a city in Sedgwick County, Kansas, United States.  As of the 2020 census, the population of the city was 806.

History
Mount Hope was founded in 1874.

Geography
Mount Hope is located at  (37.869198, -97.664663).

Demographics

2010 census
As of the census of 2010, there were 813 people, 313 households, and 206 families living in the city. The racial makeup of the city was 94.1% White, 0.4% African American, 1.4% Native American, 0.2% Asian, 2.1% from other races, and 1.8% from two or more races. Hispanic or Latino of any race were 4.7% of the population.

There were 313 households, of which 31.3% had children under the age of 18 living with them, 52.4% were married couples living together, 7.7% had a female householder with no husband present, 5.8% had a male householder with no wife present, and 34.2% were non-families. 28.8% of all households were made up of individuals, and 15.6% had someone living alone who was 65 years of age or older. The average household size was 2.47 and the average family size was 3.09.

The median age in the city was 43.8 years. 23.4% of residents were under the age of 18; 6.4% were between the ages of 18 and 24; 21.5% were from 25 to 44; 29.1% were from 45 to 64; and 19.6% were 65 years of age or older. The gender makeup of the city was 46.1% male and 53.9% female.

2000 census
As of the census of 2000, there were 830 people, 301 households, and 217 families living in the city. The racial makeup of the city was 96.27% White, 0.36% African American, 0.48% Native American, 1.08% from other races, and 1.81% from two or more races. Hispanic or Latino of any race were 3.01% of the population.

There were 301 households, out of which 37.5% had children under the age of 18 living with them, 61.8% were married couples living together, 7.0% had a female householder with no husband present, and 27.6% were non-families. 26.6% of all households were made up of individuals, and 18.3% had someone living alone who was 65 years of age or older. The average household size was 2.60 and the average family size was 3.14.

In the city, the population was spread out, with 29.0% under the age of 18, 5.3% from 18 to 24, 27.0% from 25 to 44, 20.4% from 45 to 64, and 18.3% who were 65 years of age or older. The median age was 37 years. For every 100 females, there were 82.0 males. For every 100 females age 18 and over, there were 81.8 males.

The median income for a household in the city was $38,512, and the median income for a family was $45,625. Males had a median income of $36,484 versus $29,375 for females. The per capita income for the city was $19,103. About 5.5% of families and 3.7% of the population were below the poverty line, including 1.7% of those under age 18 and 5.9% of those age 65 or over.

Education
The community is served by Haven USD 312 public school district.

Mount Hope High School was closed through school unification. The Mount Hope Pirates won the Kansas State High School boys class B Track & Field championship in 1939.

References

Further reading

External links

 City of Mount Hope
 Mount Hope - Directory of Public Officials
 Mount Hope city map, KDOT

Cities in Kansas
Cities in Sedgwick County, Kansas
Wichita, KS Metropolitan Statistical Area
Kansas populated places on the Arkansas River
1874 establishments in Kansas
Populated places established in 1874